Otto III. Weimar-Orlamünde, sometimes called Otto IV (1244 –  June 1285) was a German nobleman.  He was a member of the House of Ascania and a titular Count of Weimar-Orlamünde.  He was the ruling Count of Weimar and Lord of Rudolstadt and Plassenburg.

Life 
He was the son of Count Herman II and his wife, Beatrix of Andechs-Merania.  In 1248, Otto III and his elder brother Herman III inherited the Franconian possessions of their maternal uncle Otto II.  They divided their possessions, with Otto receiving Weimar, Rudolstadt and Plassenburg and Herman receiving Orlamünde.

On 29 December 1279, Otto III founded Himmelskron Abbey.  He died in June 1285, and was buried in the collegiate church of the abbey.

Marriage and issue 
Otto III was married to Agnes of Truhendingen (d. 13 May 1285).  Together, they had the following children:
 Otto "the Younger" (d. before September 1318)
 Otto V (d. 1315)
 Herman (d. 1319)
 Agnes (d. 1354) Abbess at Himmelkron monastery

References 
 Helmuth Meißner: Stiftskirche, ehemaliges Kloster und Schloss Himmelkron, Munichen and Berlin, 1998
 C. Chl. Freiherr von Reitzenstein: Regesten der Grafen von Orlamuende aus Babenberger und Ascanischem Stamm, Historischer Verein für Oberfranken, Bayreuth, 1871
 Theodor Zinck: Himmelkron — Beschreibung seiner Vergangenheit und Gegenwart, Bayreuth, 1925, pp. IV and 4

House of Ascania
Counts of Weimar-Orlamünde
1244 births
1285 deaths
13th-century German nobility